Arkadiusz Kasperkiewicz (born 29 September 1994) is a Polish professional footballer who plays as a centre-back for Stal Mielec.

Club career
On 4 August 2020, he joined Arka Gdynia.

References

Polish footballers
1994 births
Footballers from Łódź
Living people
Association football defenders
Widzew Łódź players
Olimpia Grudziądz players
Górnik Łęczna players
Raków Częstochowa players
Arka Gdynia players
Stal Mielec players
Ekstraklasa players
I liga players